Astragalus webberi is a rare species of milkvetch known by the common name Webber's milkvetch. It is endemic to the coniferous forests in the Sierra Nevada, in Plumas County, eastern California.

Description
Astragalus webberi is a spreading perennial herb with stems up to 50 centimeters long, and part of the stem growing underground. The leaves are up to 15 centimeters long and made up of many oval-shaped leaflets. The inflorescence bears 6 to 14 cream colored flowers, each between one and two centimeters long. The fruit is a leathery legume pod 2 to 3.5 centimeters long.

External links
Calflora Database: Astragalus webberi (Webber's milkvetch)
Jepson Manual eFlora (TJM2) treatment of Astragalus webberi
USDA Plants Profile for Astragalus webberi (Webber's milkvetch)
UC Photos gallery: Astragalus webberi

webberi
Endemic flora of California
Flora of the Sierra Nevada (United States)
Natural history of Plumas County, California
~
Critically endangered flora of California